Shirley Fleming (1929 in New York City – 10 March 2005) was an American music critic and editor.

Biography 
Born in New York City in 1929, she was the daughter of novelist Berry Fleming, who enjoyed popularity during the 1930s and 1940s with a series of successful works, and later in the 1980s with his Captain Bennett's Folly. Shirley grew up in Augusta, Georgia, and maintained a home there throughout her life. She earned both bachelor's and master's degrees from Smith College and was a classically trained violist. From 1967 to 1991, she was the editor of the magazine Musical America. She also served as editor for the publications High Fidelity, Hi-Fi Music at Home, and the American Record Guide. In 1965 she worked as a freelance writer for The New York Times and later was on that paper's music criticism staff from 1975 to 1978.

From 1978 until her death of a stroke on 10 March 2005 she wrote music criticism for the New York Post.

References

1929 births
2005 deaths
American music critics
New York Post people
Writers from Augusta, Georgia
Smith College alumni
Critics employed by The New York Times
American women journalists
Journalists from New York City
Classical music critics
American women music critics
Women writers about music
20th-century American journalists
20th-century American women
21st-century American women